Iseilema, commonly known in Australia as Flinders grass, is a genus of Asian and Australian plants in the grass family.

 Species

References

External links
 Grassbase - The World Online Grass Flora

Andropogoneae
Grasses of Asia
Poaceae genera
Poales of Australia